This article contains the results of the 2012 Republican presidential primaries and caucuses, which resulted in the nomination of Mitt Romney as the Republican nominee for President of the United States. The 2012 Republican primaries were the selection processes by which the Republican Party selected delegates to attend the 2012 Republican National Convention from August 27–30. The series of primaries, caucuses, and state conventions culminated in the national convention, where the delegates cast their votes to formally select a candidate. A simple majority (1,144) of the total delegate votes (2,286) was required to become the party's nominee.

Seven major candidates were in the race to become the nominee. Michele Bachmann was the first to drop out, ending her campaign after a poor performance in Iowa. Jon Huntsman withdrew from the race after placing third in the New Hampshire primary. Rick Perry dropped out after Iowa and New Hampshire but prior to the South Carolina primary after polling poorly. Rick Santorum suspended his campaign in April after polls showed a strong possibility that he would lose his home state of Pennsylvania to Mitt Romney, and his daughter Bella's condition worsened. Newt Gingrich withdrew after insufficient funds prevented him from moving forward with a strong campaign.  On May 14, 2012, Ron Paul announced that his campaign would switch to a delegate accumulation strategy. On May 29, according to projected counts, Mitt Romney crossed the threshold of 1,144 delegates. He was formally nominated at the Republican National Convention on August 28.

Overview of results

 The delegate totals given by the AP (Associated Press),other sites such as this one and other major news outlets are a projection and have not been officially pledged yet. This applies to a delegate from a non-binding primary or caucus election, as in Iowa, Colorado, Minnesota, Maine, and Washington. These are awarded officially at Congressional and State Conventions on a later date.
 Unprojected delegates included in Total for each State. 1,869 pledged, 417 unprojected/unpledged.
 Winner-take-all states begin with the April 3, 2012 primaries, with the exception of Florida's and Arizona's primaries.

Major candidates

Notes
*   State whose delegate total has been halved due to violation of Rule 15 of the RNC rules.
**  Vote totals in brackets consider votes for minor candidates, as well as votes for "uncommitted", "no preference", "write-ins" or other options.
a   Missouri's February 7 primary has no bearing on the allocation of the state's 52 delegates.
b   Vote totals (except for percentages) don't consider votes for minor candidates, as well as votes for "uncommitted", "no preference", "write-ins" or other options.
c   The Maine Republican Party encouraged all municipal committees to hold their caucuses between 4 to 11 February, but some were held outside this date range.
e   Delegates selected with combined way - binding primary and state convention (Indiana, Illinois, Louisiana) or summer meeting (Pennsylvania).
f   Table contains only popular votes gained during the caucus (read more).

Other primary events electing delegates

Convention roll call

The traditional roll call of the states, which shows final distribution of delegates for every candidate, took place on Tuesday August 28, the first full day of the Republican National Convention.

Other candidates
Two major candidates, who had been invited to the debates, Herman Cain and Gary Johnson, had withdrawn from the race after states began to certify candidates for ballot spots. Two serious candidates who were not invited, Buddy Roemer and Fred Karger, had a very hard time getting on primary ballots and achieved only limited success. Six candidates, L. John Davis, Randy Crow, Chris Hill, Keith Drummond, Mike Meehan, and Mark Callahan, qualified for the ballot in two primaries, while the rest, over 25 in all, were on the ballot in only one, either New Hampshire or Arizona, which both had relatively easy requirements. Some votes for minor candidates are unavailable, because in many states (territories) they can be listed as Others or Write-ins. At the conclusion of the primary season, none of these other candidates was able to be awarded any delegates.

Results
Primary and caucuses can be binding or nonbinding in allocating delegates to the respective state delegations to the National convention. But the actual election of the delegates can be at a later date. Delegates are (1) elected at conventions, (2) from slates submitted by the candidates, (3) selected by the state chairman or (4) at committee meetings or (5) elected directly at the caucuses and primaries.Until the delegates are actually elected the delegate numbers are by nature projections, but it is only in the nonbinding caucus states where they are not allocated at the primary or caucus date.

Early states
Twelve states (374 delegates) voted from January 3 to March 3. Out of 374 delegates only 172 were allocated to the candidates, 18 were unbound RNC delegates, 2 were allocated for Huntsman but were unbound, and 182 delegates  were unallocated.

Iowa

Nonbinding Caucus: January 3, 2012
State Convention: June 16, 2012
National delegates: 28

New Hampshire

Primary date: January 10, 2012
National delegates: 12#

Note
#  NH have been penalized for breaking RNC rule 15 with the loss of half its delegates, from 23 voting delegates to only 12. But all 20 delegates in NH's delegation to the National Convention have been appointed from slates submitted by the candidates. It is unknown how the 12 voting slots will be distributed. The 3 RNC delegates are not allowed to attend as voting delegates.

South Carolina

Primary date: January 21, 2012
District conventions: April 12, 2012
State convention: May 19, 2012
National delegates: 25

Florida

Closed primary: January 31, 2012
National delegates: 50 
Note: 4,063,853 registered Republicans

Nevada

Closed caucus: February 4, 2012
National delegates: 28 
Note: 400,310 registered Republicans 

 Although 22 of the 28 bound delegates are Ron Paul supporters, Republican rules require the first vote at the national convention to reflect the results of the caucus. After the first vote, all delegates become unbound.

Colorado

Closed caucus: February 7, 2012
National delegates: 36

 13 of the 17 unbound delegates are planning to vote for Paul; 1 for Santorum.

Minnesota

Open caucus: February 7, 2012
National delegates: 40

Missouri

Modified Primary: February 7, 2012
National delegates: 52 (not tied to primary vote)

Maine

Closed caucus: February 4–11, 2012
National delegates: 24

Arizona

Closed primary: February 28, 2012
National delegates: 29
Note: Delegate total was halved due to violation of Rule 15 of the RNC rules.

Michigan

Open primary: February 28, 2012
National delegates: 30

Wyoming

Closed caucus: February 11–29, 2012
National delegates: 29

Washington

Closed caucus: March 3, 2012
National delegates: 43

Super Tuesday
Super Tuesday 2012 is the name for March 6, 2012, the day on which the largest simultaneous number of state presidential primary elections was held in the United States. It included Republican primaries in seven states and caucuses in three states, totaling 419  delegates (18.2% of the total). 18 additional RNC superdelegates from the states are not bound by the voting result.

Alaska

Caucuses: March 6, 2012 
National delegates: 27

Georgia

Open primary: March 6, 2012
National delegates: 76

Idaho

Caucuses: March 6, 2012
National delegates: 32

Massachusetts

Semi-closed primary: March 6, 2012
National delegates: 41

North Dakota

Caucuses: March 6, 2012
National delegates: 28

Results prior to certification:

Ohio

Semi-closed primary: March 6, 2012
National delegates: 66

Oklahoma

Primary: March 6, 2012 
National delegates: 43

Tennessee

Primary: March 6, 2012 
National delegates: 58

Vermont

Primary: March 6, 2012 
National delegates: 17

Virginia

Primary: March 6, 2012 
National delegates: 49 
Note: Ballot restrictions resulted in most of the candidates failing to get on the ballot.

Mid-March states

Kansas

Binding caucus: March 10, 2012 
National delegates: 40

Results prior to certification with 100% of precincts reporting:

Guam

Caucus: March 10, 2012 
National delegates: 9

Northern Mariana Islands

Caucus: March 10, 2012 
National delegates: 9

U.S. Virgin Islands

Caucus: March 10, 2012 
National delegates: 9

No straw poll was taken at the caucus, but the delegates were bound to the candidate they pledged themselves to before the voting started. The six delegates receiving the most votes go to the National Convention. Three of the top vote-getters had previously pledged to Romney, and one had pledged to Paul. In addition, two of the elected uncommitted delegates committed themselves to Romney after the election.

Alabama 

Primary: March 13, 2012 
National delegates: 50

Hawaii 

Binding caucuses: March 13, 2012 
National delegates: 20

Certified results doesn't include 858 outstanding votes (write-ins and provisional ballots).

Mississippi 

Primary: March 13, 2012 
National delegates: 40 (winner-take-all if over 50%)

American Samoa 

Caucus: March 13, 2012 
National delegates: 9

Mitt Romney had the most support but there were a few votes for each of the candidates Ron Paul, Rick Santorum, and Newt Gingrich. About 70 people participated but no formal vote was taken.

Puerto Rico 

Primary: March 18, 2012 
National delegates: 23

Illinois 

Primary: March 20, 2012 
National delegates: 54

Louisiana primary 

Primary: March 24, 2012 
National delegates: 20

April states

Maryland 

Primary: April 3, 2012 
National delegates: 37

Rick Santorum was unable to receive full delegate support.

District of Columbia 

Primary: April 3, 2012 
National delegates: 19

Rick Santorum was not on the ballot.

Wisconsin 

Primary: April 3, 2012 
National delegates: 42

Connecticut 

Primary: April 24, 2012 
National delegates: 28

Official source reports a turnout of 59,639, with the difference from 59,578 likely due to blank ballots.

Delaware 

Primary: April 24, 2012 
National delegates: 17

New York 

Primary: April 24, 2012 
National delegates: 95

Pennsylvania 

Primary: April 24, 2012 
National delegates: 72

Rhode Island 

Primary: April 24, 2012 
National delegates: 19

Louisiana caucuses

Caucuses: April 28, 2012
National delegates: 26

May states

Indiana 

Primary: May 8, 2012 
National delegates: 46

North Carolina 

Primary: May 8, 2012 
National delegates: 55

West Virginia 

Primary: May 8, 2012 
National delegates: 31

Nebraska 

Primary: May 15, 2012 
National delegates: 35

Oregon 

Primary: May 15, 2012 
National delegates: 28

Arkansas 

Primary: May 22, 2012 
National delegates: 36

Kentucky 

Primary: May 22, 2012 
National delegates: 45

Texas 

Primary: May 29, 2012 
National delegates: 155

June states

California 

Primary: June 5, 2012 
National delegates: 172

Montana 

Caucus: June 5, 2012 
National delegates: 26

Results prior to certification:

New Jersey 

Primary: June 5, 2012 
National delegates: 50

New Mexico 

Primary: June 5, 2012 
National delegates: 23

South Dakota 

Primary: June 5, 2012 
National delegates: 28

Results prior to certification:

Utah 

Primary: June 27, 2012 
National delegates: 40

Results prior to certification:

See also
Prelude to the Republican presidential primaries, 2012
Republican Party presidential primaries, 2012
Republican Party presidential debates, 2012
Nationwide opinion polling for the Republican Party 2012 presidential primaries
Statewide opinion polling for the Republican Party presidential primaries, 2012
Endorsements for the Republican Party presidential primaries, 2012
Straw polls for the Republican Party presidential primaries, 2012
Democratic Party presidential primaries, 2012
United States presidential election
Results of the 2008 Republican presidential primaries

External links
CNN State-by-state scorecard: Complete state results and national totals for the 2012 Republican race
Republican Primary Tracker  from The Wall Street Journal
2012 Election Central  Analysis and news of pending debates and voting
The Green Papers: Complete descriptions of delegate allocation
The Green Papers: Major state elections in chronological order
2012 Primaries and caucuses results from CNN
The G.O.P.’s Fuzzy Delegate Math  Nate Silver's Political Calculus.

References

2012 Results
Election results in the United States